Anthony Peak is a mountain located in the Mendocino National Forest north of Mendocino Pass and is part of the Northern Coast Ranges of Mendocino County, California, approximately  NE of Covelo. The summit is the highest point in Mendocino County, and averages 61.8 inches at peak snow pack depth annually.

The rare endemic wildflower known as Anthony Peak lupine (Lupinus antoninus) was named for this peak.

The peak was probably named for James Anthony, who owned a farm in the Round Valley district in 1874.

References

External links 

 

Mountains of Mendocino County, California
Mountains of Northern California